Thieleman Janszoon van Braght (29 January 1625 – 7 October 1664) was the Anabaptist author of the Martyrs Mirror or The Bloody Theater, first published in Holland in 1660 in Dutch.

Van Braght was born in Dordrecht.  His major work claimed to document the stories and testimonies of various early Protestants and opponents of the Roman Catholic Church who died as martyrs. The full title of the book is The Bloody Theater or Martyrs Mirror of the Defenseless Christians who baptized only upon confession of faith, and who suffered and died for the testimony of Jesus, their Saviour, from the time of Christ to the year A.D. 1660. The use of the word "defenseless" in this case refers to the Anabaptist belief in non-resistance.

Bibliography
 Foxe's Book of Martyrs (1563), by John Foxe

External links

Biography in the Global Anabaptist Mennonite Encyclopedia

1625 births
1664 deaths
Dutch Mennonites
People from Dordrecht
Mennonite writers